Michael Jordan Steakhouse, founded by retired American basketball player Michael Jordan, is a fine-dining restaurant group. The main location was in Grand Central Terminal, New York City, though locations exist in Uncasville, Connecticut; Ridgefield, Washington; and Chicago.

Design
Designed by David Rockwell, the restaurant group is run by the Glazier family, a couple who owns multiple food establishments. The Grand Central location occupied a  space, seating 210. The restaurant has no sports memorabilia, but instead focuses on "Michael Jordan the businessman."

Products
The company has a line of USDA Prime Steaks, sauces, condiments, grillware and collectibles, under the Michael Jordan Steaks brand. The steaks can be ordered on their website and shipped directly to customers nationwide.

Locations
Grand Central Terminal, New York City, New York (closed in December 2018)
Magnificent Mile, Chicago
Oak Brook, Illinois
Mohegan Sun, Uncasville, Connecticut
Ilani Casino Resort, La Center, Washington

References

External links

Mohegan Sun Dining

1997 establishments in New York City
American companies established in 1997
Brand name meats
Food and drink companies based in New York City
Food manufacturers of the United States
Michael Jordan
Steakhouses in the United States
Basketball culture
Sports-themed restaurants
Grand Central Terminal
Fine dining
Restaurant chains in the United States
Restaurants established in 1997
Restaurants in New York City